Prague Integrated Transport (Czech: Pražská integrovaná doprava, PID) run by a city-owned agency called Regional Organiser of Prague Integrated Transport (ROPID), is an integrated public transport system in Prague.

Prague Integrated Transport includes metro, tram, railway, bus, ferry services, the Petřín funicular and park and ride services. Since 2020 bike-sharing is included also. PID operates in Prague and most of the Central Bohemian Region.

Prague Integrated Transport offers a unified ticketing system across all the different types of public transport services running in Prague and the Central Bohemian Region. PID also unifies regulations, route numbering plan, some parts of the information system, transfer facilities improving mixed-mode commuting, and also unified service subsidy system.

Naming and branding 
Previously, the Prague mass transit system was called IDS (integrovaný dopravní systém, integrated transport system). The modern name (pražská integrovaná doprava) was first used in 1993 as a part of the name of the ROPID organisation, which has also started using this name for the transport system itself.

In 2021 Prague Integrated Transport adopted its new design scheme, including a new logo and a new paint scheme for vehicles operating under its network. The new paint scheme includes distinctive vertical red stripes and it will be gradually introduced on all vehicles.

Tickets
The Prague Integrated Transport (PID) network operates on a proof-of-payment system. Passengers must buy and validate a ticket immediately after boarding a vehicle, or before entering a metro station's paid area. There are uniformed and plainclothes fare inspectors who randomly check passengers' tickets within the paid area; they are equipped with an inspection badge or carrier ID.

The tickets are the same for all means of transport in Prague (metro, tramways, city buses, funiculars and ferries).

Basic single transfer tickets cost 40 CZK (as of 1 August 2021) for a 90-minute ride or 30 CZK for a 30-minute ride. In November 2007 SMS purchase for basic single transfer tickets and day tickets was introduced.

Short-term tourist passes are available for periods of 24 hours (120 CZK) and 3 days (330 CZK) (1 Aug 2021).

Longer-term season tickets can be bought on the smart ticketing system Lítačka card, for periods of one month (550 CZK), three months (1480 CZK) or the annual pass for 3650 CZK.

Transporters participating in PID 
Most of the inner-city services are operated by the city-owned Prague Public Transit Company (Czech: Dopravní podnik hl. m. Prahy, DPP), which is the sole operator of Prague Trams and Metro and also the operator of most inner-city bus services and the Petřín funicular. Regional bus services and rail services are operated by various contract operators.

All contract operators are required to comply with the standards of Prague Integrated Transport, therefore offering a similar level of services.

Commuter rail 
Current commuter rail operators are:
 České dráhy, a.s. (all lines except the ones operated by the contractors below)
 KŽC Doprava, s.r.o. (lines S34, S43)
 ARRIVA vlaky s.r.o. (lines R21, R22, R24, R26, S49)
 RegioJet, a.s. (lines R23, planned S49 and S61)

Metro, trams, Petřín funicular 

City rail services are de facto monopolised by Dopravní podnik hl. m. Prahy, which operates all Prague tram and metro services, and the Petřín funicular. To date, there have not been any realistic proposals of any other transporter to operate any services of this kind.

Bus and coach services

Dopravní podnik hl. m. Prahy 
City bus services in Prague were originally operated by multiple city-owned enterprises, later merged into a single entity: Dopravní podnik hl. m. Prahy. Today, this company operates most of the city bus services, and also some of the suburban coach services.

Other bus transporters participating in PID 

 Arriva City, s. r. o.
 ČSAD Střední Čechy
 ČSAD POLKOST, spol. s r. o.
 ČSAD MHD Kladno, a. s.
 MARTIN UHER, spol. s r. o.
 Okresní autobusová doprava Kolín, s. r. o.
 ABOUT ME, s. r. o 
 ARANEA, s. r. o
 ARRIVA STŘEDNÍ ČECHY, s.r.o.
 STENBUS, s. r. o.
 Jaroslav Štěpánek
 PROBO BUS a.s.
 Vlastimil Slezák
 Societa o. p. s.

Waterway transport 
Boat services are operated by:
 Pražské Benátky s. r. o.
 Vittus group s. r. o.
 Pražská paroplavební společnost a. s.

References

External links 

 Prague Integrated Transport

Public transport in Prague